Filbert may refer to:

People
 Peter Filbert (1793–1864), American politician
 John H. Filbert (died 1917), founder of J.H. Filbert
 Filbert Bayi (born 1953), Tanzanian middle-distance runner
 Jammal Filbert Brown (born 1981), American football offensive tackle

Other uses
 Corylus, the filbert tree or hazel, a genus of deciduous tree
 Corylus maxima, the filbert, a species of hazel
 Filbert nut or hazelnut, any of the nuts deriving from species of the genus Corylus
 Filbert paintbrush for artists
 The Filbert (horse) (foaled in 1980), a New Zealand bred race-horse
 Filbert, South Carolina, an unincorporated community
 Filbert, West Virginia, a former town now part of the City of Gary
 Filbert the Fox, Leicester City Football Club's mascot
 J.H. Filbert, an American manufacturer of butter substitutes

See also
 
 Philbert (disambiguation)
 Philibert (disambiguation)